Jatin Bala is a Dalit author who was born Parhiyali, Manirampur in Jessore in the then East Pakistan on 5 May 1949.

One of his stories, "On firm ground", is included in translation in  Survival and Other Stories: Bangla Dalit Fiction in Translation. 2012.

Works

Poetry
 Jeebaner Naam Jantrana (The name of Life is Pain)
 Minati Keu Rakheni (Nobody Has Kept Request)
 Aamar Shabdai Shanita Astra (My Words as Sharpened Weapon)
 A Verse as a Sharpened Weapon (Translated into English by Satya Debnath)

Short Story
 Nepo Nidhan Parba (Nepo Slain Episode)
 Gondir Bandhe Bhangan (Dissolution in the Barrage of Circle)
 Vanga Banglar Dui Mukha (Two faces of Broken Bengal)
 Samaj Chetanar Galpo
 Stories of Social Awakening: Reflections of Dalit Refugee Lives of Bengal(translated from Bangla into English by Jaydeep Sarangi)

Novel
 Aamriter Jiban Kotha (Life of Elixir)
 Shikarh Chhenrha Jeeban(Root Severing Life) (Autobiographical)

Research Articles
 Dalita Sahitya Aandalan (Dalit Literary Movement)
 Bastu Badi Motua Aandalan (Materialistic Motua Movement)
 Satya Aannetion (In Search of Truth)
 Itihasher Aloke Sri Hari Guruchand o Matua Aandalan'' (Sri Hari Guruchand in the light of History and Matua Movement)

See also
 Dalit Literature

References

Living people
1949 births
Dalit writers
Bengali writers
20th-century Indian short story writers
20th-century Indian novelists
Bangladeshi male novelists
Bangladeshi short story writers
People from Jessore District
Writers from West Bengal